Is the Alabama Boys Choir is a promotional EP recording by Verbena released in 2003 on Capitol Records.  Tracks 1 and 2 were from the then forthcoming album, La Musica Negra, while tracks 3 through 6 were all previously unreleased and can only be found on this release.

Track listing
All songs written by Scott Bondy.

"Killing Floor (Get Down on It)" – 3:01
"All the Saints" – 3:19
"Six White Horses" – 3:51
"Dr. Strangelove" – 2:03
"Criminals and Beauty Queens" – 4:55
"The List" – 1:40

Personnel
Scott Bondy – vocals and guitar
Anne Marie Griffin – guitar and vocals
Nick Daviston – bass
Les Nuby – drums

Production
Producer: Rob Schnapf, Ed Buller and Verbena
Engineer: Doug Boehm, Kent Matcke, Chris Manning and Damian Shannon
Mixing: Rob Schnapf, Doug Boehm and Ed Buller

References

Verbena (band) albums
2003 EPs
Capitol Records EPs